Kimberly Foster may refer to:

Kimberly Foster (actress) (born 1961), American actress
Kimberly L. Foster, American engineer
Kimberly N. Foster (born 1989), American writer